The common name swamp crayfish may refer to any of several species:
Tenuibranchiurus glypticus
Procambarus clarkii, the "red swamp crayfish"

Euastacus australasiensis
Astacus leptodactylus, the "narrow-clawed crayfish"

Animal common name disambiguation pages